"Rain" is a song by the English progressive rock/hard rock band Uriah Heep, which was originally released on their fifth studio album, The Magician's Birthday, in 1972. Though the song was never released as a single, it is one of the most well-known songs from the album.  It was written by Ken Hensley, who also performed the keyboard/piano element of the song, with vocals by David Byron. It was the band's first song to utilize only the keyboards/piano and vocals with some additional bass guitar parts. AllMusic said the song was a "lovely piano ballad".  Songwriter Hensley recorded a slightly different version for inclusion on his 1973 debut solo album Proud Words on a Dusty Shelf.

Recording
The song was recorded and mixed at Lansdowne Recording Studios, London, in September 1972. It was released on The Magician's Birthday in November of the same year.

Personnel 
 David Byron – Vocals
 Ken Hensley – Keyboards, Piano
 Gary Thain – Bass guitar

References 

1972 songs
1970s ballads
Songs written by Ken Hensley
Uriah Heep (band) songs